Slipstream (Davis Cameron) is a fictional character in Marvel Comics universe. He is a superhero associated with the X-Men. Created by writer Chris Claremont and artist Salvador Larroca, he first appeared in X-Treme X-Men #6 (December 2001).
 
He is a mutant, able to generate a "warp wave" for the purpose of teleportation. He and his sister Lifeguard were briefly members of the squad of X-Men featured in the series X-Treme X-Men.

Fictional character biography
He and his sister Heather lived perfectly normal lives at Surfers Paradise in Australia. They did not know that their actual father was an underworld crime lord known as Viceroy. Upon his death, they were attacked. When Heather's life was endangered, Davis was informed by Sage that although he was never meant to be a mutant (his latent mutant gene was supposed to be passed down to his children), his mutant power might be helpful to her. He agreed to let her activate it, gaining a teleportational ability in the form of the "warp wave". Together with Storm and Thunderbird III, he and his sister manage to defeat their attackers. Following these events, both siblings join Storm's team of X-Men. Davis had a brief romance with Storm.

Later, when infiltrating the ship of the intergalactic warlord, Khan, Heather develops a more avian look, leading to speculation that the two have Shi'ar heritage. Ultimately, Davis is unable to see past his sister's alien appearance and leaves the X-Men.

Slipstream is confirmed to be among the mutants who lost their powers as a result of M-Day.

Following the creation of the Mutant Nation of Krakoa, Slipstream was somehow repowered and became a loyal citizen of Krakoa and is seen helping fight off the Russian Armed Forces that attacked the island.

Powers and abilities
Slipstream can teleport via a funnel of trans-spatial energy also called a Warp Wave, to any place on earth. Warp Waves use superstrings to connect any two locations on Earth. He is not only able to teleport himself but also can take other people through the Warp Wave, but requires increased concentration to maintain the wave when traveling with others. Sensitivity to displacement energy signatures enable him to track other teleportation effects back to their origin from residual energies and after detecting this, he could use the warp wave to travel to their location. He usually navigates with the use of a shortened metal surfboard.

Other versions

X-Men: The End
In X-Men: The End, a title presenting one possible future of the X-Men, Slipstream works freely for the slavers. It is eventually revealed that he is seemingly controlled by Cassandra Nova. His powers have also further developed to the point that he can now transverse the warp-wave across inter-galactic distances.

Reception

 In 2014, Entertainment Weekly ranked Slipstream 85th in their "Let's rank every X-Man ever" list.

Comic Book Resources placed him as one of the superheroes Marvel wants you to forget.

References

External links
 UncannyXmen.net Character Profile on Slipstream

Australian superheroes
Comics characters introduced in 2001
Characters created by Chris Claremont
Characters created by Salvador Larroca
Fictional characters who can manipulate reality
Fictional characters who can manipulate time
Fictional extraterrestrial–human hybrids in comics
Fictional people from Queensland
Fictional surfers
Marvel Comics aliens
Marvel Comics male superheroes
Marvel Comics mutants
Marvel Comics characters who can teleport
Marvel Comics characters who have mental powers
Marvel Comics hybrids

it:Slipstream (personaggio)